Happy People is the second studio album by British indie rock band Peace, released on 9 February 2015. Happy People was produced by Jim Abbiss and Duncan Mills.

Reception 

Happy People received generally positive reviews upon release, gaining a score of 8/10 with NME, and 5/5 stars from The Independent, and positive reviews from Redbrick, who stated that "you'll still find yourself singing along to the hook hours after". However, The Guardian gave the album 2/5 stars, calling it "reheated baggy leftovers skilfully marketed at people who hadn't yet been born in 1990". Most reviewers have picked up on the clear 90s influences on the album, stating similarities between Peace and bands such as Oasis and Blur.

Track listing

Personnel 
Peace
 Harrison Koisser – vocals, guitar (all tracks) production (9, 15–17)
 Samuel Koisser – bass guitar (all tracks), background vocals (1–6, 8, 9, 11–15, 17, 18)
 Douglas Castle – guitar
 Dominic Boyce – drums (all tracks), background vocals (1–6, 8–15, 17, 18)

Additional musicians
 Liz Lawrence – background vocals (1, 9)
 Wired Strings – strings (1, 10)
 Keri Arrindell – background vocals (3, 7)

Technical
 Jim Abbiss – production (1–3, 5, 7, 10–14, 18)
 Dunca Mills – production (4, 6, 8)
 Mazen Murad – mastering
 Craig Silvey – mixing (1–3, 5, 7, 10–15, 18)
 Eduardo De La Paz Canel – mixing (4, 6, 8, 9), engineering assistance (1–3, 5, 7, 10–16, 18)
 Edd Hartwell – mixing (16, 17), engineering (1–3, 5, 7, 10–18)
 Nick Taylor – engineering (1, 10)
 Lee Slater – engineering (4)

Notes

References 

Peace (band) albums
2015 albums